Gudde Mardi is a small hill near the city Shimoga, Karnataka, India. There is a Lord Eshwara temple on the hill. The site and can be reached by auto rickshaw. The best time to visit is in the early evenings during summer season, as the stones are slippery during the monsoon.

References

Hills of Karnataka
Shimoga
Geography of Shimoga district